Notable events of 2001 in webcomics.

Events

Phil and Kaja Foglio's Girl Genius launched in print.
The Web Cartoonists' Choice Awards were established to "represent a form of peer recognition, with voting rights granted only to creators working on online webcomics."

Awards
Web Cartoonist's Choice Awards, "Outstanding Comic" won by Adam Burke's Boxjam's Doodle.
Eagle Awards, "Favourite Web-Based Comic" won by Pete Abrams' Sluggy Freelance.

Webcomics started

 January 1–March 26 — King of Fighters Doujinshi by Vinson Ngo
 January 16 — Okashina Okashi - Strange Candy by Emily Snodgrass and J. Baird
 March 1 — Jack by David Hopkins
 March 2 — 8-Bit Theater by Brian Clevinger
 March 29 — Nodwick by Aaron Williams
 August 30 — The Morning Improv by Scott McCloud
 September 2 — toothpaste for dinner by Drew
 September 9 — VG Cats by Scott Ramsoomair
 September 10 — Makeshift Miracle by Jim Zubkavich
 October 1 — Achewood by Chris Onstad
 October 9 — Get Your War On by David Rees
 October 16 — Big Fat Whale by Brian McFadden
 October — Nowhere Girl by Justine Shaw
 December 19 — Something*Positive by R. K. Milholland
 The Perry Bible Fellowship by Nicholas Gurewitch
 When I Am King by Demian5
 Zombie and Mummy by Olia Lialina and Dragan Espenschied

References

 
Webcomics by year